The 2015 NACRA Sevens was an Olympic qualification tournament for Rugby sevens at the 2016 Summer Olympics held in the United States at WakeMed Soccer Park in Cary, North Carolina on 13–14 June 2015.
The teams were split into two groups. The top two teams in each group advanced to the semi-finals. The winning team qualified directly to the Olympics, and the second and third placed teams advanced to the Olympic Qualification Tournament.

Pools

Note: The team from Saint Vincent and the Grenadines was scheduled to participate in Pool A, but withdrew after their players were denied visas to enter the United States.

Pool stage 

The ranking of each team in each group was determined as follows:

 higher win percentage in all group matches;
 points obtained in all group matches;
 most of wins (including Overtime Wins) in all group matches;
 highest points difference in all group matches;
 lowest points against in all group matches;

Pool A

Pool B

Placement stage

Fifth to eighth

Title playoffs

Final standings

See also
 2015 NACRA Women's Sevens

References

2015
2015 rugby sevens competitions
2015 in North American rugby union
2015 in American rugby union
International rugby union competitions hosted by the United States
Rugby sevens at the 2016 Summer Olympics – Men's tournament
rugby union
Sports in Raleigh-Durham
Rugby sevens competitions in the United States